Suat Soylu (1960, Niğde) is a Turkish chess player and a former Turkish Chess Champion.

Biography 
Soylu was born in 1960 in Niğde, started playing chess in 1974. He won the 1981 Turkish Chess Championship and was the runner-up in the 1998 Turkish Chess Championship. He played for the Turkish national team at Chess Olympiads of 1984, 1990, 1992 ,1994, 1998, 2000 and 2002. Soylu won the individual silver medal for his board at 29th Chess Olympiad and 35th Chess Olympiad.

Soylu earned FIDE title, International Master (IM) in 2003.

References

External links 

 Suat Soylu at FIDE
Suat Soylu at Chessgames

Turkish chess players
Living people
1960 births